Short Cut to Red River is a 1958 western novel by Noel Loomis that won the Spur Award for Best Western Novel.

Plot summary
During an expedition to expand to establish a new trade route, Ross Phillips comes across white women captives that were taken by a Comanche chief. One of the captives have once saved Phillips' life.

References

1958 American novels